Charles Cordell (b. 5 October 1720; d. at Newcastle-on-Tyne, 26 January 1791) was an English Roman Catholic priest.

Life

He was the son of Charles Cordell and Hannah Darrell, of the Cordell family of Scotney Castle and Calehill, Kent. He was educated first at "Dame Alice's School", Fernyhalgh, afterwards at Douai College, where, in 1739, he began his course of philosophy.

Having been ordained priest, he left the college 10 June 1748, for England, where he served the mission at Arundel (1748–55), Rounday, in Yorkshire, the Isle of Man, and finally Newcastle upon Tyne (1765–91). In 1778 the presidency of the English college at Saint-Omer was offered to him, but he would not accept it.

He was a scholarly, book-loving man, of some note as a preacher. In politics he remained a staunch Jacobite.

Works

He published many translations and one original pamphlet, "A Letter to the Author of a Book called 'A Candid and Impartial Sketch of the Life and Government of Pope Clement XIV'" (1785). The translations include

"The Divine Office for the Use of the Laity" (4 vols., Sheffield, 1763; 2d ed., 2 vols., Newcastle, 1780);
Bergier's "Deism Self-refuted" (1775); 
Caraccioli's "Life of Pope Clement XIV" (1776); Letters of Pope Clement XIV (2 vols., 1777); 
Fronsletin's "Travels of Reason" (1781); 
Fleury's "Manners of the Christians" (1786) and "Manners of the Israelites" (1786); 
"Larger Historical Catechism" (1786); and 
"Short Historical Catechism" (1786).

References

Attribution
 The entry cites:
John Kirk, Biographies (Early Nineteenth Cent.) (London, 1908);
Catholic Miscellany (1826), VI, 387; 
Notes and Queries, 3d series, X, 330, 383; 
Joseph Gillow, Bibl. Dict. Eng. Cath. (London, 1885), I, 565; 
Thompson Cooper in Dictionary of National Biography (London, 1887), XII, 213.

1720 births
1791 deaths
18th-century English Roman Catholic priests
People from Little Chart
People from Lamberhurst